, known as Disney Sports Football in Europe, is a pair of 2002 sports video games released by Konami, one for the GameCube, and the other for the Game Boy Advance.

Teams 
 The Superstars (captain: Mickey Mouse, teammates: cats, jersey: blue)
 The Charmers (captain: Minnie Mouse, teammates: bunnies, jersey: red)
 The Seaducks (captain: Donald Duck, teammates: roosters, jersey: vertical teal and navy stripes)
 The Belles (captain: Daisy Duck, teammates: hens, jersey: lilac with purple trim)
 The Spacenuts (captain: Goofy, teammates: dalmatians, jersey: green)
 The Steamrollers (captain: Pete, teammates: pigs, jersey: orange)
 The Imperials (captain: Mortimer Mouse, teammates: mongrels, jersey: purple with gold trim)
 The Wolfgangs (captain: Big Bad Wolf, teammates: wolves, jersey: burgundy with black trim)
 The TinyRockets (Huey, Dewey, and Louie & José Carioca)
 Mickey's All-Stars (Mickey, Minnie, Donald, Daisy and Goofy) 
 Pete's All-Stars (Pete, Mortimer and Big Bad Wolf)

Reception 

The GameCube version received "generally favorable reviews", while the Game Boy Advance version received "average" reviews, according to the review aggregation website Metacritic. In Japan, Famitsu gave it a score of 29 out of 40 for the GameCube version, and 23 out of 40 for the GBA version.

References

External links 
 

2002 video games
Soccer
Association football video games
Game Boy Advance games
GameCube games
Konami games
Donald Duck video games
Mickey Mouse video games
Goofy (Disney) video games
Video games developed in Japan
Games with GameCube-GBA connectivity
Multiplayer and single-player video games